Mohammad Khan Tang-e Sepu (also Romanized as Moḩammad Khān Tang-e Sepū; also known as Moḩammad) is a village in Dehdasht-e Sharqi Rural District, in the Central District of Kohgiluyeh County, Kohgiluyeh and Boyer-Ahmad Province, Iran. At the 2006 census, its population was 107, in 21 families.

References 

Populated places in Kohgiluyeh County